Jean-François "Jeff" Lucquin (born 25 December 1978) is a French professional golfer.

Having played on the Challenge Tour for four seasons, Lucquin finally gained his place on the European Tour for 2003 by finishing second in the 2002 Challenge Tour rankings, winning the Panalpina Banque Commerciale du Maroc Classic along the way.

After struggling in his first season on the European Tour, Lucquin regained his card for the following season at the qualifying school. He then improved his standing each year, until winning in 2008 his first European Tour title at the Omega European Masters, defeating Rory McIlroy in a playoff, and went on to finish the season ranked 52nd on the Order of Merit.

He lost his exemption after the 2010 season. He announced the end of his professional career in December 2016 to work as a coach assisting Benoît Ducoulombier.

Amateur wins
1997 French Youths Championship

Professional wins (5)

European Tour wins (1)

European Tour playoff record (1–0)

Challenge Tour wins (1)

Other wins (3)
1999 Moliets, Gujan-Mestras, Omnium National (all French Tour)

Results in major championships

CUT = missed the half-way cut
"T" = tied for place
Note: Lucquin only played in the U.S. Open.

References

External links

French male golfers
European Tour golfers
Sportspeople from Valence, Drôme
People from Nyon District
1978 births
Living people